Laeliopsis is a genus of moths in the family Lasiocampidae. The genus was erected by Per Olof Christopher Aurivillius in 1911.

Species
Laeliopsis erythrura Aurivillius, 1914
Laeliopsis gemmatus Wichgraf, 1921
Laeliopsis maculigera Strand, 1913
Laeliopsis punctuligera Aurivillius, 1911

References

Lasiocampidae